UsedSoft (stylized usedSoft in both English and German) is a used-software commerce company that instituted the business-to-business (B2B) market for used computer programs. The company is headquartered in Zug, Switzerland.

History and company structure 
UsedSoft was founded in 2003 by Peter Schneider.

The companies UsedSoft Deutschland GmbH (Dortmund) and UsedSoft Europe (Amsterdam) are wholly owned subsidiaries and distributors of UsedSoft International AG.

Sales work is performed by a sales organization consisting of some 40 persons active all over Germany and Europe. UsedSoft also launched an online shop in 2013.

When Schneider died in June 2022 after a serious illness, existing executives Johannes Jäger and Michael Aufderheide took over operation of the company.

Business model 
UsedSoft purchases and sells standard computer programs that have already been used by other users. Since it does not suffer from wear, contrary to other products, software retains the same quality as brand new products. Licenses on the used market are available for around 30 percent below the price on new software.

UsedSoft maintains business operations exclusively in Europe. Its customer base includes large companies, SMEs, and public agencies, including Edeka, Woolworth, Harry Broth, s.Oliver, Segafredo, the airports of Munich and Salzburg, law firms, an association in Germany's Bundesliga soccer league, savings and loans banks, as well as the City of Munich, Germany's Federal Social Court in Kassel, and the Thuringia Police.

Legal foundation 
The legal foundation for used software trade consists of the "principle of exhaustion" in copyright law. This principle lays out that a manufacturer's distribution right to a product is "exhausted" the first time it brings the product into circulation. Thus, the buyer can resell the product secondhand. In Europe, EU Directive 2009/24/EC expressly permits trading used computer programs.

ECJ ruling 
Since 2005, Oracle and UsedSoft have carried out a legal dispute in Germany on the question of whether UsedSoft is permitted to trade used Oracle licenses. The dispute was taken all the way to Germany's Federal Court of Justice, the country's highest court, which ultimately passed the case to the European Court of Justice (ECJ) for adjudication.

The ECJ's ruling was announced on 3 July 2012 (case C-128/11). The ECJ ruled, barring further recourse for appeal, that the principle of exhaustion applies to every first-time sale of software. Thus, used software trade has been declared fundamentally legal. According to the Court, this also applies to software that has been transmitted online. The ECJ even laid out that the second acquirer of computer programs that have been transmitted online may download the software from the manufacturer:  according to the ECJ.

See also 
 Discount-Licensing
 Volume license key

References

External links 
 
 Microsoft Volume Licensing
 Microsoft Volume Licensing Service Center
 European Court of Justice Press Release No. 94/12 from 3 July 2012

Companies based in Zug
Online retailers of Switzerland